Kibatalia wigmani is a species of plant in the family Apocynaceae. It is a tree endemic to Sulawesi in Indonesia. It is a vulnerable species threatened by habitat loss.

References

wigmani
Endemic flora of Sulawesi
Trees of Sulawesi
Vulnerable plants
Taxonomy articles created by Polbot
Taxa named by Sijfert Hendrik Koorders